Murisi Zwizwai is the Zimbabwe Deputy Minister of Mines and Mining Development. He is the Member of House of Assembly for Harare Central (MDC-T).

References

Year of birth missing (living people)
Living people
21st-century Zimbabwean politicians
Citizens Coalition for Change politicians
Members of the National Assembly of Zimbabwe
Movement for Democratic Change – Tsvangirai politicians
People from Harare